William Alexander McCaw  (born 26 August 1927) is a former New Zealand international rugby union player. He was a member of the All Blacks in 1951 and in 1953–54, playing in the number 8 and flanker positions.

Early life
McCaw was born in Gore and educated at St. Kevin's College, Oamaru where he played rugby for the school.

Senior rugby
McCaw played for the Marist club and represented Southland from 1949 until 1955. He played for the South Island Team in the years 1950–54 and was a New Zealand trialist in 1950, 1951 and 1953 and 1957. He played in a New Zealand XV in 1952 and 1954–55.

All Black
McCaw was selected for the All Blacks in 1951. He played against in the 1951 tour of Australia and played in all three tests. He could not play because of injury in 1952. In 1953 he was selected again and participated in the 1953–1954 British tour. He played in 22 of 36 matches including the Welsh and French tests. He was captain of the All Blacks in the game against North of Scotland. In all McCaw played 32 matches for the All Blacks, 5 of them were tests. He gained 18 points for New Zealand (6 tries).

References

1927 births
Living people
New Zealand international rugby union players
New Zealand rugby union players
People educated at St Kevin's College, Oamaru
People from Gore, New Zealand
Southland rugby union players
Rugby union flankers
Rugby union number eights
Rugby union players from Southland, New Zealand